The Edward Mooney House is a building at 18 Bowery, at the corner of Pell Street, in the Chinatown neighborhood of Manhattan, New York City. It was built between 1785 and 1789 for wealthy butcher Edward Mooney on land he purchased after it was confiscated from British Loyalist James De Lancey.

The brick house was built in a mixture of Georgian and Federal styles, and is New York City's earliest remaining Early Federal style townhouse. It has three stories plus an attic and full basement. The home was located close to the slaughterhouses, holding pens and tanneries where Mooney made his living; he occupied the house until his death c.1800.

In 1807, the size of the house was doubled by an addition to the rear. The house would be used as a private residence until the 1820s after which it has served at various times as a hotel, brothel and saloon.

The house was designated a New York City landmark in 1966 and was added to the National Register of Historic Places in 1976.

See also
National Register of Historic Places listings in Manhattan below 14th Street
List of New York City Designated Landmarks in Manhattan below 14th Street

References
Notes

External links

Bowery
Chinatown, Manhattan
Federal architecture in New York (state)
Five Points, Manhattan
Georgian Revival architecture in New York City
Houses completed in 1785
Houses in Manhattan
Houses on the National Register of Historic Places in Manhattan
New York City Designated Landmarks in Manhattan